Clion is a commune in the Charente-Maritime department in southwestern France.

Geography
The village lies on the west bank of the Seugne, which forms most of the commune's northeastern border.

Population

See also
 Communes of the Charente-Maritime department

References

External links
 

Communes of Charente-Maritime